Shruthi Rajanikanth is an Indian actress, model, and RJ from Ambalapuzha who rose to fame through the Malayalam TV series  Chakkappazham  aired on Flowers TV. She started her acting career as a child artist in the Malayalam TV series Unnikuttan.

Early life 
Shruthi is the daughter of Rajanikanth J. who is a business man and Lekha Rajanikanth, a makeup artist from Alappuzha. She also has an younger brother Sangeeth R.

Education 
After her schooling at Chinmaya Vidyalaya, Alappuzha, she did BA in Mass Communication and Journalism at Pazhassiraja College,  Pulpally, Wayanad and MA in Mass Communication and Journalism at Bharathiar University, Coimbatore.

Filmography

Television

Films

Webseries

References

External links
 
 
 
 

Actresses from Alappuzha
Living people
Actresses in Malayalam television
Actresses in Malayalam cinema
Year of birth missing (living people)